My Wife and I may refer to:
 My Wife and I (TV series), a 1958 British television comedy
 My Wife and I (film), a 1925 American drama film
 My Wife & I, a 2017 Nigerian comedy family film